Orocrambus ephorus is a moth in the family Crambidae. It was described by Edward Meyrick in 1885. It is endemic to New Zealand. It has been recorded from the South Island. The species' preferred habitat consists of alpine tussock grasslands.

The wingspan is 31–39 mm. Adults have been recorded on wing from November to February.

References

Crambinae
Moths described in 1885
Moths of New Zealand
Endemic fauna of New Zealand
Taxa named by Edward Meyrick
Endemic moths of New Zealand